Lorenzo de' Medici (1449–1492), or Lorenzo the Magnificent, was an Italian statesman, banker, de facto ruler of the Florentine Republic and patron of Renaissance culture.

Lorenzo de' Medici may also refer to:

People
Lorenzo the Elder (1395–1440)
Lorenzo di Pierfrancesco de' Medici (1463–1503)
Lorenzo de' Medici, Duke of Urbino (1492–1519)
Lorenzino de' Medici (1514–1548), or Lorenzaccio
Lorenzo de' Medici (1599–1648), seventh child of Ferdinando I de' Medici, Grand Duke of Tuscany
Lorenzo de' Medici (author) (1951- ), italian historian, novelist.

Other uses
Lorenzo de' Medici School, in Florence, Italy

See also
Lorenzo De Medici Sweat (1818–1898), an American politician
Lorenzaccio, an 1834 play by Alfred de Musset
Lorenzaccio (film), 1951
Lorenzaccio (horse) (1965–1983)